41st Division or 41st Infantry Division may refer to:

Infantry divisions
 41st Infantry Division (France)
 41st Division (German Empire)
 41st Infantry Division Firenze, Kingdom of Italy
 41st Division (Imperial Japanese Army)
 41st Division (Philippines)
 41st Infantry Division (Poland)
 41st Rifle Division (Soviet Union)
 41st Division (Spain)
 41st Division (United Kingdom)
 41st Infantry Division (United States)

Other divisions
 41st Air Division, United States Air Force
 41st Guards Rocket Division, a unit of the Soviet and Russian Strategic Rocket Forces

See also
 41st Army (disambiguation)
 41st Brigade (disambiguation)
 41st Regiment (disambiguation)
 41st Battalion (disambiguation)
 XLI Corps (disambiguation)
 41st Regiment (disambiguation)
 41st Squadron (disambiguation)